In military terms, 123rd Division or 123rd Infantry Division may refer to:

 Infantry divisions 

 123rd Infantry Division (France), a World War I division of the French Army
 123rd Infantry Division (German Empire)
 123rd Infantry Division (Wehrmacht)
 123rd Division (Imperial Japanese Army)
 123rd Infantry Division (Russian Empire), a World War I division of the Imperial Russian Army
 123rd Rifle Division, a division of the Soviet Union's Red Army
 123rd Guards Motor Rifle Division, a division of the Soviet Army